Locomotive Duplex was an experimental 4-cylinder steam locomotive designed by John Haswell of the Austrian State Railway Works at Vienna and built in 1861. It was exhibited at the 1862 International Exhibition and was then used on the line from Prague to Podmokly (part of Děčín today) where it worked till 1900. Prague was the capital of Bohemia, which became part of the Austro-Hungarian Empire in 1867.

Overview
This 4-2-0 locomotive was the last of 12 engines of the same type. Only this one was equipped with 2 cylinders on each side. The angle between the crankpins on one side was 180° with the pistons going opposite directions. There was one common valve gear with crossed steam channels. The angle between the pairs of engines on each side was normal at 90°.

Purpose
The main idea was to eliminate dynamic forces. This was successfully exhibited when the locomotive was hung on chains. It silently simulated a run at maximum speed (60 km/h) without swinging.

See also
 Imperial Royal Austrian State Railways

References

Sources 
Jindřich Bek: Atlas Lokomotiv - historické lokomotivy, page 94, NADAS Prague 1979

4-2-0 locomotives
Imperial Royal Austrian State Railways steam locomotives
Standard gauge locomotives of Austria
Lokomotivfabrik der StEG locomotives